Prof. M. K. Cheriyan (born 13 August 1940) popularly known as Kozhuvallor M. K. Cheriyan is a retired Principal of Bishop Moore College, an aided college in Mavelikara, Alappuzha district of Kerala, India. He served as the Principal of Bishop Moore College from 1989 - 1996. Prof. Cheriyan is an eminent teacher, a literarian, biblical scholar and orator.

Biography

Prof. Cheriyan was born in Kozhuvallor, near Chenganoor. He did his early education at C.M.S Middle School, Kodukulanji and J.M. High School Kodukulanji. He finished his intermediate education at S. B College, Changanassery and took his bachelor's degree in Zoology major from N. S. S College in Panthalam. Prof. Cheriyan completed his master's degree at S. B College, Changanassery majoring in Malayalam Language and Literature in 1962.

Tenure at CMS College Kottayam

After finishing his education he started working as Malayalam Lecturer at CMS College Kottayam. He worked at CMS College from 1962 to 1964 as lecturer in Malayalam Department. In 1964, along with two of his colleagues Prof. Cheriyan joined Bishop Moore College in Mavelikara started by Church of South India (CSI).

Tenure at Bishop Moore College

 Lecturer, Malayalam Department - 1964 to 1966.
 Professor, Malayalam Department - 1967 to 1975
 Head of the Department, Malayalam - 1975 to 1993
 Vice Principal - 1986 to 1989
 Principal - 1989 to 1996

After his retirement he served as the Principal of India Bible College in Paranthal.
 
Prof. M. K. Cheriyan authored and published 15 books. His latest book "Gaveshana Swaryabham" won the first Njananikshepam Award in the year 2000.

On his 60th birthday in the year 2000, one of his students Thomas Neelaarmadam published a book named "Gaveshana Saraniyude Upaasakan" about Prof. M. K. Cheriyan and his contributions.

External links 
 Gaveshana Swaryabham
 Former Principals of Bishop Moore College

1940 births
Living people
Malayalam-language writers